Shakuntala Khatik is an Indian politician and a member of the Indian National Congress party. She has been Member of Legislative Assembly from Karera constituency.

Personal life
She is married to Lakhanlal Khatik and has three sons and one daughter.

Political career
She contested the 2008 assembly elections unsuccessfully but she became an MLA for the first time in 2013.

Legal affairs
There was an FIR against Shakuntala for inciting a mob to burn down a police station during the protests against Mandsaur Firing in June 2017 in Karera.

See also
Madhya Pradesh Legislative Assembly
2013 Madhya Pradesh Legislative Assembly election
2008 Madhya Pradesh Legislative Assembly election

References

External links
 

1965 births
Living people
Indian National Congress politicians from Madhya Pradesh
21st-century Indian women politicians
21st-century Indian politicians
Madhya Pradesh MLAs 2013–2018
Women members of the Madhya Pradesh Legislative Assembly